Pune Strykers (abbreviated as PS) is an Indian professional hockey team based in Pune, Maharashtra that plays in the World Series Hockey. Currently, Canadian Ken Pereira is the captain of the team and is coached by Gundeep Singh. The team is owned by Sai Grace Sports & Events Private Limited. PCMC Hockey Stadium in Pune is the home ground of Pune Strykers.

Pune Strykers ended up as the runner-up of the inaugural edition of World Series Hockey. They lost to Sher-e-Punjab by 5 goals to 2 in the final. Team's penalty corner expert Gurpreet Singh is the top-scorer for the team with 12 goals.

History

2012 season

Pune Strykers suffered a major set back when they lost their captain and ace drag-flicker Diwakar Ram to a wrist injury just before the commencement of the tournament. Pune Strykers started their campaign with a  victory over Mumbai Marines in a see-saw battle at Mahindra Hockey Stadium in Mumbai by 7–5. They continued with a victory over Delhi Wizards but drew next three matches. Their undefeated run came to an end when they lost to Chandigarh Comets 3–1. They only won two of their next six matches. With almost knocked out of the tournament they defeated table-toppers Sher-e-Punjab and Bhopal Badshahs in their final two matches. A defeat to Chennai Cheetahs by Mumbai Marines gave them their semi-final berth.

Finishing number fourth on the table, they faced the first positioned team in the league phase, Chandigarh Comets, in the second semi-final. Down by 4–1, they struck thrice in the final 10 minutes to extend the match into the penalty shoot-out which they won by 3–2 and entered the final to face Sher-e-Punjab. They were dominated in the final and suffered 5–2 defeat and hence ended up at number 2 position.

Pune Strykers staged some of the brilliant comebacks in WSH 2012 due to the likes of Mario Almada and were often referred to as Masters of Comeback, the first of which came against Mumbai Marines in their opening match in which they won by 7–5 despite of trailing by 5–3. They managed to draw with Sher-e-Punjab (3–3) from 3–1. In a must win situation, they lagged behind Bhopal Badshahs by 4 goals to 1 but ended up winning by 5–4. But the greatest of all comebacks came in the semi-final against the Comets where Strykers trailed 4-1 for the majority of the regulation time and then 0-2 in the penalty-shootout but made a dramatic comeback, winning 3–2 in penalty shoot-outs after finishing 4–4 after the 70 minutes.

Franchisee Details

Ownership
Sai Grace Sports and Events Private Limited (SGSEPL) is the owner of the Pune franchise. The director of SGSEPL, Manoj Choudhary is the promoter of Jewel Products, one of India’s leading corporate gifting and innovation companies.

Team Anthem
Pune Strykers anthem is sung by Shankar Mahadevan. The lyrics are written by Mahesh Sutar and the music is composed by Nishadh Chandra. The Universal Music Group is the music partner of the team.

Sponsors and Partners
The team is partnered by Gold's Gym for fitness and Café Coffee Day for on-ground hospitality. Radio City is their official Radio partner.

Administration
Owners - Manoj Choudhary (Sai Grace Sports & Events Pvt. Ltd.)
CEO - Jagdeep Nanjappa
Manager - Mervyn Fernandis
Trainer - Simon Pachal
Video analyst - Major (rtd). K.R. Singh
Physio - Meetu Mangalvedkar
Coach - Gundeep Singh
Assistant coach - Rahul Singh

Team Composition
The team is led by Canadian Ken Pereira and coached by Gundeep Singh.

Fixtures and Results

2012

Statistics

Hat-tricks

4 Player scored 4 goals

References

See also
World Series Hockey

World Series Hockey teams
Sport in Pune
2011 establishments in Maharashtra